Miss Bangladesh is a national beauty pageant in Bangladesh which also selects other winners to participate in big beauty pageants like Miss Universe (separate pageant under Miss Bangladesh) and Miss World.

History
The Miss Bangladesh Contest was first organized in 1994, but the event did not attract national media attention. In 1994, Anika Taher first represented Bangladesh at the beauty pageant Miss World 1994 held in Sun City, South Africa. Shaila Simi was awarded the Miss Ruposhi Dhaka, Bangladesh award in 1998.  Sonia Gazi (who was Miss Bangladesh 2000) received media attention. Tabassum Ferdous Shaon, who participated in the Miss World 2001 in South Africa was the last Bangladeshi contestant. Bangladesh has not sent a representative to Miss World since 2001. The pageant returned briefly for one year in 2007 and was organized by Apurbo.com and sponsored by Motherland Group/Cinevision. However, the winner did not take part in Miss World. After 16 years later Antar Showbiz was created Miss World Bangladesh to give Bangladesh the opportunity to participate in the "Miss World" pageant again. Shirin Akter Shila become the first Miss Universe Bangladesh who represented her country in Miss Universe 2019.

Titleholders

Miss Bangladesh (1994–2001)

Winners by district

Miss Universe Bangladesh

Winners by district

Miss World Bangladesh

Winners by district

Miss Earth Bangladesh

Winners by district

International pageants

Miss Universe Bangladesh 
The winner of Miss Universe Bangladesh represents her country at the Miss Universe. On occasion, when the winner does not qualify (due to age) a runner-up is sent.

Miss World Bangladesh

Miss Grand Bangladesh

Miss Charm Bangladesh

Miss Earth Bangladesh

Miss Intercontinental Bangladesh

Miss Supranational Bangladesh

Miss Asia Pacific Bangladesh

See also

Miss Bangladesh
Miss Universe Bangladesh
Miss World Bangladesh

References

External links
 

Recurring events established in 1994
Bangladesh
Bangladesh
Bangladesh
Bangladesh
Bangladesh
Beauty pageants in Bangladesh
Bangladeshi awards